The 2016–17 season was the 105th season in CD Tenerife’s history.

Squad

Competitions

Overall

Liga

League table

Copa del Rey

References

CD Tenerife seasons
Tenerife